New Canaan is a census-designated place (CDP) in the town of New Canaan, Fairfield County, Connecticut, United States. It represents the built-up center of town around the intersections of Main Street, East Street, Elm Street, and South Avenue. It was first listed as a CDP prior to the 2020 census.

References 

Census-designated places in Fairfield County, Connecticut
Census-designated places in Connecticut